The First Nudie Musical is a 1976 American musical comedy film directed by Mark Haggard and Bruce Kimmel.

Overview
The movie is a comedy starring Cindy Williams, Stephen Nathan and Bruce Kimmel. Nathan plays Harry Schechter, heir to a Hollywood studio forced to make a musical comedy porno in order to stave off bankruptcy. The movie features a series of farcical lewd musical numbers in the style of classical Hollywood musical comedies including: "Orgasm", "Lesbian Butch Dyke", and "Dancing Dildos." The movie has a low-budget feel, with a "musical-within-a-movie" theme in the tradition of Singin' in the Rain, but with satirical sexual humor.

An early staple of Cinemax, it has become a cult film since its initial release and was released on DVD in 2001 and is currently available on Blu-ray on Kritzerland.  The film is featured in Cult Movies II by Danny Peary, and has a long entry in the book about 1970s film musicals, We Can Be Who We Are by Lee Gambin. It was one of several farcical musical-comedy collaborations between Kimmel (who also co-starred in the movie) and Williams, along with The Creature Wasn't Nice in 1981. Originally distributed by Paramount Pictures in 1976, it was picked up by World-Northal in 1977 and re-released to great acclaim, first in New York, where it played for three months exclusively at the 68th Street Playhouse before gaining wider distribution.  The first week of its wide release, it was the fourth highest-grossing picture in the country, behind Star Wars, You Light Up My Life, and The Spy Who Loved Me.

Reception
The film received polarized reviews. Judith Crist raved about the film in the New York Post, saying, "Chockful of youthful talent, well spiced by outrageousness and sparked by invention. The three stars are simply irresistible. Cindy Williams is enchanting, Kimmel is the ultimate appealing schnook. Fresh and funny and funky. Made for about 1 percent of the budget of New York, New York, but a hundred times funnier and more perceptive." Joseph Gelmis of Newsday also raved, "More vitality, imagination, zany comedy and stellar performances than most movies. It's one of the most memorable movies of this year. A raunchy delight. Cindy Williams is a marvel! Kimmel is a joy to watch!" The film also received rave reviews from Kathleen Carroll of the New York Daily News, who wrote, "Bright, bawdy, gleefully naughty! Bruce Kimmel is endearingly funny," as well as Bruce Williamson of Playboy ("A Mel Brooksian salute to porno chic") and Howard Kissell of Women's Wear Daily ("Funny, naughty, surprisingly charming. Ingenuous, bright performances". But it was panned by Janet Maslin of The New York Times, who described the concept of the film as "a losing proposition" and found the music "tuneless." Arthur D. Murphy of Variety wrote, "A few clever bits are drowned in a larger sea of silliness, forced gags and predictable cliche." Gene Siskel of the Chicago Tribune gave the film half of one star out of four, calling it "juvenile" and "flaccid." Alan M. Kriegsman of The Washington Post panned the film for "crude photography, bad editing, sophomoric story and forgettable music."

Kevin Thomas of the Los Angeles Times was more positive, writing, "Silly, sophomoric, at times downright inept, this little low-budget venture picked up by Paramount is more often than not hilarious, offering good, tonic laughter to those not offended by nudity and blunt language." Leonard Maltin's film guide gave it two stars out of four and noted, "Basically a one-joke idea that wears thin despite an air of amiability."

The First Nudie Musical holds an 86% rating on Rotten Tomatoes based on seven reviews.

References

External links

1976 films
1970s musical comedy films
American musical comedy films
American sex comedy films
Films about pornography
Paramount Pictures films
1970s English-language films
1970s sex comedy films
1976 comedy films
1970s American films